Mining is the extraction of geological materials from the Earth.

Mining may also refer to:

 Mining, Austria, a municipality in Upper Austria
 Mining (military), a siege tactic
 Data mining, the process of extracting knowledge from a data set
 Social media mining, extracting data from social media
 Mining (cryptocurrency), the allocation of processing power for cryptocurrency transactions with the expectation of a reward
 Bitcoin mining see Bitcoin network
 Mianning, the Daoguang Emperor, eighth emperor of the Manchurian Qing dynasty

See also
 Mine (disambiguation)